Vilo Acuña Airport  is an international airport serving Cayo Largo del Sur, a small coral island in Cuba. It is located within the special municipality (municipio especial) of Isla de la Juventud.

Facilities

On February 20, 2020, damages to the only airport runway forced tourist passengers to return to the mainland via boat.

Airlines and destinations

References

External links

 Detailed information about Cayo Largo airport
 
 

Airports in Cuba
Buildings and structures in Isla de la Juventud